The Pink Panther in: Olym-Pinks, is an animated sports-themed special featuring the Pink Panther. The show first aired on ABC on February 22, 1980 to coincide with the 1980 Winter Olympics. This was the last Pink Panther production to be produced by DePatie–Freleng Enterprises before reorganizing itself as Marvel Productions as well as the last Pink Panther production involving creator Friz Freleng before departing the company to return to Warner Bros. Animation.

The previous ABC Pink Panther special, A Pink Christmas, aired in 1978. A third special, Pink at First Sight was broadcast in 1981.

Plot 
In Lake Placid, New York, the Pink Panther and the Little Man are competitors in a series of Winter Olympic games. The problem is, the Little Man is a very bad sport who will resort to outrageously blatant cheating to win. Despite several comical mishaps (including being chased by a piano that seemingly wants his head on a silver platter, an upside-down chase through the snow after falling off a ski lift and trying to nurse the Little Man through a bad cold), the panther triumphs at downhill racing, ski jumping and bobsledding and wins the Gold medal while the little man earns a Silver and his sneezing puts out the Olympic flame.

Home media
On November 6, 2007, Olym-Pinks was released alongside A Pink Christmas and Pink at First Sight on the DVD collection The Pink Panther: A Pink Christmas from MGM Home Entertainment/20th Century Fox Home Entertainment.

References

External links 

1980 television specials
1980s American television specials
The Pink Panther (cartoons) television specials
American Broadcasting Company television specials
Television specials by DePatie–Freleng Enterprises
Films scored by Robert J. Walsh